Seminiferous tubules  are located within the testes, and are the specific location of meiosis, and the subsequent creation of male gametes, namely spermatozoa.

Structure
The epithelium of the tubule consists of a type of sustentacular cells known as Sertoli cells, which are tall, columnar type cells that line the tubule.

In between the Sertoli cells are spermatogenic cells, which differentiate through meiosis to sperm cells.  Sertoli cells function to nourish the developing sperm cells.  They secrete androgen-binding protein, a binding protein which increases the concentration of testosterone.

There are two types: convoluted and straight, convoluted toward the lateral side, and straight as the tubule comes medially to form ducts that will exit the testis.

The seminiferous tubules are formed from the testis cords that develop from the primitive gonadal cords, formed from the gonadal ridge.

Function

Spermatogenesis, the process for producing spermatozoa, takes place in the seminiferous tubules.  During spermatogenesis, the DNA of spermatogenic cells in the seminiferous tubules is subject to damage from such sources as reactive oxygen species.  The genomic integrity of spermatogenic  cells is protected by DNA repair processes.  Deficiencies in the enzymes employed in these repair processes may lead to infertility.

Additional images

See also
 Leydig cells

References

External links
 
 Image
 Diagram 

Testicle
Scrotum